The list of ship launches in 1818 includes a chronological list of some ships launched in 1818.


References

Sources

1818
Ship launches